Swavesey was a rural district in Cambridgeshire, England, from 1894 to 1934.

It was formed under the Local Government Act 1894 from the part of the St Ives rural sanitary district which was in Cambridgeshire (the rest being in Huntingdonshire).

It covered the civil parishes of
Boxworth
Conington
Fen Drayton
Lolworth
Over
Swavesey

It was merged in 1934 under a County Review Order into the Chesterton Rural District.  It now forms part of the South Cambridgeshire district.

References
http://www.visionofbritain.org.uk/relationships.jsp?u_id=10210409&c_id=10001043

Districts of England created by the Local Government Act 1894
History of Cambridgeshire
Rural districts of England